Christelle Mol (born 3 January 1972) is a French badminton player. She competed in women's singles and women's doubles at the 1992 Summer Olympics in Barcelona.

References

External links

1972 births
Living people
French female badminton players
Olympic badminton players of France
Badminton players at the 1992 Summer Olympics
20th-century French women